Self Portrait is Raymond Lam's seventh album. It was released on August 17, 2012. The album contains 11 tracks and 5 music videos (CD + DVD).

Track listing

CD 

 頑石

 寂寞星球

 年時

 暗中作樂

 一刀切

 膠椅

 Because of You

 LFX 6.8

 The One

 I'm Okay

 頑石點頭（國語）

DVD - Music videos 

 頑石

 一刀切

 Because of You

 I'm Okay

 頑石點頭（國語）

References

2012 albums
Raymond Lam albums